Hanjaruiyeh (also Romanized as Hanjarū’īyeh and Hanjarūyeh; also known as Hangarū) is a village in Dasht-e Khak Rural District, in the Central District of Zarand County, Kerman Province, Iran. At the 2006 census, its population was 60, in 20 families.

References 

Populated places in Zarand County